Cannabis strains are either pure or hybrid varieties of the plant genus Cannabis, which encompasses the species C. sativa, C. indica, and C. ruderalis.

Varieties are developed to intensify specific characteristics of the plant, or to differentiate the strain for the purposes of marketing or to make it more effective as a drug. Variety names are typically chosen by their growers, and often reflect properties of the plant such as taste, color, smell, or the origin of the variety. The Cannabis strains referred to in this article are primarily those varieties with recreational and medicinal use. These varieties have been cultivated to contain a high percentage of cannabinoids. Several varieties of cannabis, known as hemp, have a very low cannabinoid content, and are instead grown for their fiber and seed.

Major variety types

Taxonomic paradigm

The two species of the Cannabis genus that are most commonly grown are Cannabis indica and Cannabis sativa. A third species, Cannabis ruderalis, is very short and produces only trace amounts of tetrahydrocannabinol (THC), and thus is not commonly grown for industrial, recreational or medicinal use. However, because Cannabis ruderalis flowers independently of the photoperiod and according to age, it has been used to breed autoflowering strains.

Pure sativas are relatively tall (reaching as high as 4.5 meters), with long internodes and branches, and large, narrow-bladed leaves. Pure indica varieties are shorter and bushier, with wider leaflets. They are often favored by indoor growers for their size. Sativas bloom later than indicas, often taking a month or two longer to mature. The subjective effects of sativas and indicas are said to differ, but the ratio of tetrahydrocannabinol (THC) to cannabidiol (CBD) in most named drug varieties of both types is similar (averaging about 200:1). Unlike most commercially developed strains, indica landraces exhibit plants with varying THC/CBD ratios. Avidekel, a medical marijuana strain developed in Israel, has a very low content of THC but a high content of CBD, limiting its psychoactive potential while exploring the beneficial medical effects of the latter.

The informal designation sativa and indica may have various, controversial meanings. Morphologically, the name sativa designates tall plants with narrow leaves, while indica refers to short plants with wide leaves. Among the marijuana community however, sativa rather refers to equatorial varieties producing stimulating psychoactive effects, whereas indica-type plants from Central Asia are used for relaxing and sedative drugs (THC:CBD > 1).

Alternative classifications

There is an increasing discussion about whether the differences between species adequately represents the variability found within the genus Cannabis.

There are five chemotaxonomic types of cannabis: one with high levels of THC, one which is more fibrous and has higher levels of CBD, one that is an intermediate between the two, another one with high levels of cannabigerol (CBG), and the last one almost without cannabinoids.

There has also been a recent movement to characterize strains based on their reported subjective effects. For example, WoahStork has used machine learning algorithms to classify strains into six Distinct Activity groups.

Breeding

In addition to pure indica, sativa, and ruderalis varieties, hybrid varieties with varying ratios of these three types are common, such as the White Widow hybrid which has about 60% indica and 40% sativa ancestry. These hybrid varieties exhibit traits from both parental types. There are also commercial crossbred hybrids which contain a mix of both ruderalis, indica or sativa genes, and are usually autoflowering varieties. These varieties are bred mostly for the medicinal cannabis market, since they are not very appreciated by recreational cannabis users because ruderalis varieties are lower in THC and impart a slightly unpleasant taste.  "Lowryder" was an early auto-flowering hybrid that retained the flowering behavior of ruderalis plants, while also producing appreciable amounts of THC and CBD. Autoflowering cannabis varieties have the advantage of being discreet due to their small stature. They also require shorter growing periods, as well as having the additional advantage that they do not rely on a change in the photoperiod to determine when to flower.

Breeding requires pollinating a female cannabis plant with male pollen. Although this occurs spontaneously and ubiquitously in nature, the intentional creation of new varieties typically involves selective breeding in a controlled environment.

When cannabis is cultivated for its psychoactive or medicinal properties, male plants will often be separated from females. This prevents fertilization of the female plants, either to facilitate sin semilla flowering or to provide more control over which male is chosen. Pollen produced by the male is caught and stored until it is needed.

When a male plant of one strain pollinates a female of another strain, the seeds will be F1 hybrids of the male and female. These offspring will not be identical to their parents. Instead, they will have characteristics of both parents. Repeated breeding results in certain characteristics appearing with greater regularity.

It is impossible for a hermaphrodite to create any male-only seeds. A hermaphrodite may create female only seeds and hermaphrodite seeds. Also the female-only seeds may carry the hermaphrodite trait.

Hybridization is the process of plants and animals breeding. Natural wind currents help speed up this hybridization process and promotes a positive growth. Some plants produce many seeds while some produce little to none depending on how it is bred. If seeds are produced traits from both the original parents will be expressed.

Techniques such as mutation breeding are used to develop new strains using irradiation or chemical mutagens such as colchicine. Various companies have been experimenting with creating new strains using genetic engineering techniques.

THC vis-à-vis CBD 

During the selective breeding process for medical marijuana, THC:CBD ratios are accounted for and accommodated to the needs of the client's preference/illness. Due to the large genetic diversity and different geographical climates and environments, a wide range of strains and properties exist.

THC is associated with the psychoactive high, while CBD is not psychoactive and is purported to have medicinal properties.

There is little evidence about the safety or efficacy of cannabinoids in the treatment of epilepsy.

Genetic stability 

In order for there to be genetic stability within a marijuana strain the breeder has to go through selection and breeding, pinpointing the dominant and recessive genes within the two strains being crossed. After analyzing offspring with the preferred traits a breeder is looking for, the breeder will select the preferred traits and continue to breed those offspring to create the desired final product. Selection is a crucial process for a breeder to create a strain, especially if a client is looking for something with specific plant traits the breeder has to ensure that the hybrid's genetic traits have been closed in enough so unwanted traits aren't expressed in future harvests.

Varieties

In a retail market that is decriminalized such as in The Netherlands, where wholesale production is illegal but prosecutions are not always enforced because of the contradiction of the law that is recognised by the courts, competition puts pressure on breeders to create increasingly attractive varieties to maintain market share. Breeders give their strains distinct and memorable names in order to help differentiate them from their competitors' strains, although they may in fact be very similar.

Acapulco Gold

Acapulco Gold is a golden-leafed Cannabis sativa strain originally from the Acapulco area of southwest Mexico.

Bedrocan

Bedrocan is a medicinal cannabis variety cultivated from a Dutch medical marijuana Cannabis sativa L. strain, having a standardized content of THC (22%) and CBD (1%). It is currently cultivated by Bedrocan Nederland, Bedrocan Canada and Bedrocan Česká Republika. It was introduced in 2003 and is dispensed through pharmacies after prescription from a physician.

Blue Dream

Blue Dream is a hybrid cannabis strain widely used for both medical and recreational purposes, developed in 2003.

Charlotte's Web 

Charlotte's Web is a high-cannabidiol (CBD), low-tetrahydrocannabinol (THC) cannabis variety and extract marketed as a dietary supplement under federal law of the United States. It is produced by the Stanley brothers in Colorado. It does not induce the psychoactive "high" typically associated with recreational marijuana strains that are high in THC. In September 2014, the Stanleys announced that they would ensure that the product consistently contained less than 0.3% THC. Charlotte's Web gained national attention when it was used to treat Charlotte Figi's epileptic seizures. Her story has led to her being described as "the girl who is changing medical marijuana laws across America," as well as the "most famous example of medicinal hemp use".

Skunk

Skunk refers to cannabis strains that are strong-smelling and have been likened to the smell of the spray from a skunk. These strains of cannabis are believed to have originated during the early 1990s in the United States prior to larger-scale development and popularization by Dutch growers. Just as with other strains of cannabis, skunk is commonly grown in controlled indoor environments under specialized grow lights, or in a greenhouse when full outdoor conditions are not suitable; skunk strains are hybrids of Cannabis sativa and Cannabis indica.

Sour Diesel 

Sour Diesel is a hybrid strain of Cannabis sativa and Cannabis indica.

See also
 Autoflowering cannabis

References

External links 

 

 
Cannabis-related lists